The Central American and Caribbean Games (CAC or CACGs) are a multi-sport regional championship event, held quadrennial (once every four years), typically in the middle (even) year between Summer Olympics. The games are for countries in Central America, the Caribbean, Mexico, and the South American Caribbean countries of Colombia, Guyana, Suriname, and Venezuela.

The games are overseen by Centro Caribe Sports (formerly CACSO). They are designed to provide a step between sub-CACG-region Games held the first year following a Summer Olympics (e.g. Central American Games) and the Continental Championships, the Pan American Games, held the year before the Summer Olympics.

The last Games were held in Barranquilla, Colombia between 19 July to 3 August 2018. The next Games will be held in San Salvador as main host in 2023.

History 
The CACGs are the oldest continuing regional games in the world, and only the Olympics have run longer. Mexico, Cuba and Guatemala were the three countries present at the first games, which were then called the Central American Games. In 1935 their name was changed to Central American and Caribbean Games to reflect expanding participation.

The 1942 edition was suspended after the impact of the World War II.

A "Central American Games" does exist today, Juegos Centroamericanos, involving just Central American countries.

Editions

The first two editions of the Games were known as the "Central American Games" at the time, but the edition lineage continued after the inclusion of the Caribbean nations in 1935.

Sports

Nations

Historical medal count 

The following medals were won:

Central American and Caribbean Beach Games

Central American and Caribbean Junior Games

See also
Centro Caribe Sports – organizers of the Central American and Caribbean Games
Pan American Games
Bolivarian Games
Central American and Caribbean Games on Spanish Wikipedia 
Athletics at the Central American and Caribbean Games
Central American Games
South American Games
 Central American and Caribbean Athletic Confederation
 Latin American Table Tennis Union

References

Citations 
 

 
International sports competitions in Central America
International sports competitions in the Caribbean
Recurring sporting events established in 1926
Multi-sport events in North America